Cockburn Street is a picturesque street in Edinburgh's Old Town, created as a serpentine link from the High Street to Waverley Station in 1856. Originally named Lord Cockburn Street after the then recently-deceased Scottish lawyer, judge and literary figure Henry, Lord Cockburn who was influential in urging his fellow citizens to remain vigilant in ensuring that early-Victorian expansion, e.g. improvements such as Cockburn Street, did not irrevocably damage or obliterate the built heritage and environment.

Lord Cockburn's head is carved over the entrance to 1 Cockburn Street (the former Cockburn Hotel) which now serves as offices for the Edinburgh Military Tattoo.

The street contains a series of small specialist shops.

History

The street was sliced through the previous medieval pattern of closes in order to give a more gentle gradient and wider thoroughfare to Waverley Station (opened in 1846 but then only accessible via narrow and steep lanes from the Royal Mile). The truncated ends of the closes were remodelled in the Scots Baronial style from 1859 to 1864. The majority of buildings are by the firm of Peddie & Kinnear. It was originally called Lord Cockburn Street but the "Lord" was abandoned within ten years.

The street is largely 4 storeys high but is dominated by the huge rear edifice of the City Chambers, which tower 12 storeys above the street as seen from this side. Given that the building dates from 1761, this is evidence to Edinburgh's fondness for high-rise structures dating back to the 18th century.

Medieval Remnants

All closes to north and south retain the medieval street pattern. 

Most closes on the south side (leading to the Royal Mile) contain remnants from the 16th century. The most impressive are Warriston Close and Advocates Close.

Closes on the north side are generally 19th century.

Notable features

One of the buildings on the north side has high level carvings of an owl and pussycat, linking to the then contemporary poem The Owl and the Pussycat by Edward Lear.

Several shops retain huge timber shutters which uniquely drop below ground level when the shops are open.

Featured in film

The doorway, roofscape and top flats of 51 Cockburn Street appear prominently in the film Hallam Foe.

Scenes for the movie Avengers: Infinity War were filmed in the street in April 2017.

The chase seen between Mark and Begbie in Trainspotting 2 includes a sequence on Cockburn Street.

References

Old Town, Edinburgh
Streets in Edinburgh
Shopping streets in Scotland
Tourist attractions in Edinburgh